Miinisadam Naval Base ('Mine Harbor') is a naval base at Tallinn Bay, Tallinn. The base is used since 1994 by Estonian Navy. Besides Estonian vessels the base accommodates also NATO countries' vessels.

References

Ports and harbours of Estonia
Estonian Navy